The Maple Leafs entered the season as defending Stanley Cup champions. The franchise hosted the 21st National Hockey League National Hockey League All-Star Game. It was played at Maple Leaf Gardens on January 16, 1968. The Toronto Maple Leafs defeated an all-star team by a score of 4–3. The Leafs missed the playoffs for the first time since 1958 with a record of 33–31–10 for 76 points for a fifth place in the East Division. The Leafs finished with a better record than any of the six expansion teams that season.

Offseason

NHL Draft

Players lost in Expansion Draft
The following Maple Leafs were lost to various franchises in the Expansion Draft.

Regular season

Season standings

Record vs. opponents

Schedule and results

Player statistics

Regular season
Scoring

Goaltending

Transactions
The Maple Leafs were involved in the following transactions during the 1967–68 season.

Trades

Intra-League Draft

Reverse Draft

Free agents

Awards and records
 Johnny Bower and Bruce Gamble, Runner-up, Vezina Trophy
 Bruce Gamble, All-Star Game MVP
 Tim Horton, 1967-68 NHL First Team All-Star

References
 Maple Leafs on Hockey Database

Toronto Maple Leafs seasons
Toronto Maple Leafs season, 1967-68
Tor